Stéphane Caristan (born 31 May 1964) is a retired hurdler from France, who set the world's best year performance in 1986. He did so by winning the men's 110 metres hurdles final at the European Championships in Stuttgart, clocking 13.20, which was also his personal best. He competed in three consecutive Summer Olympics for his native country, starting in 1984. Caristan later became the coach of French sprinter Christine Arron.

International competitions

1Did not finish in the final

Personal bests
Outdoor
110 metres hurdles – 13.20 (+2.0 m/s, Stuttgart 1986)
400 metres hurdles – 48.86 (Barcelona 1992)
Indoor
60 metres hurdles – 7.50 (Liévin 1987)

References

External links 
 
 
 
 
 
 Profile 
 All-Athletics profile

1964 births
Living people
Sportspeople from Créteil
French male hurdlers
Athletes (track and field) at the 1984 Summer Olympics
Athletes (track and field) at the 1988 Summer Olympics
Athletes (track and field) at the 1992 Summer Olympics
Olympic athletes of France
Athletics (track and field) coaches
European Athletics Championships medalists
Athletes (track and field) at the 1991 Mediterranean Games
Athletes (track and field) at the 1993 Mediterranean Games
Mediterranean Games gold medalists for France
Mediterranean Games medalists in athletics
World Athletics Indoor Championships winners
World Athletics Indoor Championships medalists